Knight Club is a 2001 American film starring Lou Diamond Phillips and directed by Russell Gannon.

Plot
A failed actor is promoted to head bouncer at one of Los Angeles' hottest nightclubs where he struggles to remain loyal to legendary bouncer Dick Gueron, the leader of the fearsome Knights. When a rival nightclub makes a tempting offer, the allure of success threatens to destroy everything he has worked for.

References

External links

2001 films
2001 action thriller films
American thriller films
Films set in Los Angeles
2001 directorial debut films
Films scored by Terry Plumeri
Films about actors
2000s English-language films
2000s American films